Chiara Maria Gemma (born 20 September 1968, Brindisi) is an Italian politician who was elected as a member of the European Parliament in 2019.

References

1968 births
Living people
MEPs for Italy 2019–2024
21st-century women MEPs for Italy
Five Star Movement MEPs
People from Brindisi
Together for the Future politicians